Markazi Jamia Masjid Rawalpindi is a mosque located in Rawalpindi, Pakistan. 

The mosque is one of the few antique mosques in the Potohar region. On the city's busiest roadway, the mosque is situated on the namesake Jama Masjid Road. The mosque, which is spread over 18 kanals, is an example of Islamic architecture. Three domes and  dozen minarets make up the mosque. The Awqaf Department is in charge of running the mosque.

History
The mosque was founded by Pir Mehr Ali Shah and Pir Mehra Sharif in 1896 and  completed in 1902.

References

Rawalpindi District
Mosques in Punjab, Pakistan
1896 establishments in British India
Mosques completed in 1902
20th-century mosques